Jaton hemitripterus is a species of sea snail, a marine gastropod mollusk in the family Muricidae, the murex snails or rock snails.

Description

Distribution

References

 Lamarck J.B. (1816). Liste des objets représentés dans les planches de cette livraison. In: Tableau encyclopédique et méthodique des trois règnes de la Nature. Mollusques et Polypes divers. Agasse, Paris. 16 pp.
 Lamarck, J. B. P. A., 1822 Histoire naturelle des animaux sans vertèbres, vol. 7, p. 711 pp
 Petuch E.J. & Berschauer D.P. (2019). New species of mollusks (Gastropoda and Bivalvia) from the tropical western Atlantic, West Africa, and Red Sea. The Festivus. 51(3): 218-230
 Nolf F. & Hubrecht S. (2020). A comparative study of the Jaton species in East Atlantic waters. Neptunea. 15(2): 11–36.

Ocenebrinae
Gastropods described in 1816